Fountain Correctional Center for Women was a women's prison in unincorporated Edgecombe County, North Carolina, near Rocky Mount. It was operated by the North Carolina Department of Corrections and later the North Carolina Department of Public Safety.

The prisoners were often used to clean up litter around the Rocky Mount area.

In May 2014 Governor of North Carolina Pat McCrory passed budget recommendations that asked for the closure of this prison. This prison and the North Piedmont Correctional Center for Women were to be closed because of a decline in the number of female prisoners. The women were to be moved to the Eastern Correctional Institution, which was to be converted into a women's facility.

Fountain closed in December 2014.

References

External links
 Girls Behind Bars." WITN. November 29, 2007.  Features this prison
 "Fountain Correctional Center long overdue for closing" (Opinion). Rocky Mount Telegram. Wednesday June 11, 2014.

Prisons in North Carolina
Women's prisons in the United States
2014 disestablishments in North Carolina
Rocky Mount, North Carolina
Edgecombe County, North Carolina
Women in North Carolina